Statutes of Durazzo were the highest form of expression of self-government of Durrës during Medieval Ages. Durrës had a long experience of self-government and privileges charters since confirmed by Byzantine Emperors. When the city was captured by Karl Thopia the statutes were hidden by the community, reappearing in 1392 when the city was handed over to Venetians. The Venetians confirmed the statutes of the city in 1392 and reconfirmed them in 1401 and 1423.

References

Durrës